Aberdeen Township may refer to the following townships in the United States:

 Aberdeen Township, New Jersey
 Aberdeen Township, Brown County, South Dakota

Township name disambiguation pages